Melon Dezign was an Amiga demoscene group founded in Denmark on October 21, 1991 by Seen (Henrik Lund Mikkelsen) and Paleface (Jacob Gorm Hansen). Originally, they were a subgroup of Crystal, where they at first exclusively created intros for cracked games. Shortly after the formation, they were joined by Bannasoft (Johan Kjeldgaard-Petersen), and after helping organise The Party, a demo event with more than 1200 attendees, several other members joined, including Walt, Mack, Performer, Audiomonster in France, Mikael and Benjamin in Norway and Mark Knight otherwise known as TDK in the UK.

The group was notable in the scene for their focus on design: this meant seamless transitions and less focus on impressive algorithms, although several of their productions gained high placings in competitions. Often, a Melon Dezign intro would feature a simple vector-based graphic (such as their logo) on a bichrome background, where other scene groups at the time would have their vector graphics inside a window or as the only thing on screen. Their recognizable logo was also a recurring factor in their productions, where other groups often featured several different, even within the same production.

Paleface and Seen produced the game Naughty Ones which was released in 1994 by Interactivision. The AGA version of Naughty Ones was cracked by Crystal (though released under the Paradox label; the OCS version was cracked by a group called Kingdom).

A second game on Amiga is produced by Melon Dezign, Jimmy's Fantastic Journey, distributed in 1995 by Lionheart Software Design, programmed by Christian Hessenbruch, with graphics by Henrik Lund Mikkelsen and Christophe Branche (aka Walt, from the French division), an original soundtrack composed by Raphaël Gesqua (aka Audiomonster, also from the French division), and sound effects by David A. Filskov and Sune M. Pedersen.

In 2000, the French division produced the music video for the song "Come Together" on the occasion of the launch of the website of the British group The Beatles and the release of the compilation disc 1.

After his stint in demoscene, Gesqua began in 1991 a career as a composer and sound designer for video games (Flashback, Snow Bros, Mr Nutz, Fade to Black, Moto Racer, Shaq Fu ...), then also for the film industry (Livid, Among the Living, The Red Spider, The Deep House ...)

Awards

Amiga demos 
 Easter Conference (1992), 1st place, Humantarget 
 The Party (1992), 1st place, Tetris Intro
 Assembly demo party (1993), 3rd place, Romantic Demo 
 The Computer Crossroad party (1993), 3rd place, How to Skin a Cat 
 Kindergarden   (1995), 2nd place, Melkedemo 
 Somewhere In Holland (1995), 1st place, "Planet M." 
 Somewhere In Holland (1995), 2nd place, "Baygon"

PC demos 
 The Gathering (1996), 2nd place, Ninja 2 
 The Party (1997), 1st place, Tribes

After the demoscene 
The French part of the group (Walt and Alex) is now a web design company, specialising in commercial production of Flash animation. The Danish members have been involved in various web and games projects, such as the Hitman games from IO Interactive. TDK, having worked for Mindscape International, Bullfrog Productions, Electronic Arts, Visual Science, and Codemasters, released his first chiptune album, entitled Reawakening, on December 9, 2012. He left Codemasters in 2017 to form his own company, Sonic Fuel.

See also

References

External links 
 Melon Dezign web design, founded by Walt and Alex
 Index of demoscene productions on Pouet
 TDK

1991 establishments in Denmark
Demogroups